In molecular biology, snoRNA U16 (also known as SNORD16)  is a non-coding RNA (ncRNA) molecule which functions in the modification of other small nuclear RNAs (snRNAs). This type of modifying RNA is usually located in the nucleolus of the eukaryotic cell which is a major site of snRNA biogenesis. It is known as a small nucleolar RNA (snoRNA) and also often referred to as a guide RNA.

snoRNA U16 belongs to the C/D box class of snoRNAs which contain the conserved sequence motifs known as the C box (UGAUGA) and the D box (CUGA). Most of the members of the box C/D family function in directing site-specific 2'-O-methylation of substrate RNAs.

U16 is predicted to guide the 2'O-ribose methylation of 18S ribosomal RNA (rRNA) residue A484  and is encoded within an intron of the gene for ribosomal proteins L1 in animals.  This snoRNA was independently named MBII-98 in mouse.

References

External links 
 
 

Small nuclear RNA